Neverland is the eighth extended play by South Korean-Chinese girl group WJSN. It was released on June 9, 2020, by Starship Entertainment and distributed by Kakao M. It contains a total of six songs, including the lead single "Butterfly".

Members Cheng Xiao, Meiqi and Xuanyi were not a part of the album release due to the scheduling conflicts in China.

Background and release 
On May 11, 2020, WJSN revealed through its official social media accounts that the group would release a new mini-album. The tracklist was revealed on May 17. Neverland and the music video for "Butterfly" were released on June 9.

Composition 
The title track was composed and co-written by Galactika, the music production team behind Itzy's biggest hits. This marks the first time they worked with Cosmic Girls.

Some of the members participated in the writing and production of some songs on the EP. Seola is credited as one of the writers and composers of "Our Garden"; while Exy is credited as a co-writer on all tracks and also as a co-composer on "Tra-la".

Commercial performance 
Neverland sold more than 47,000 copies in its first day of release, besting the group's personal record with As You Wish, which sold more than 34,000 copies in the first day of release. The EP sold almost 53,000 copies by its second day, also besting their first week sales set by As You Wish, which sold almost 50,000 copies in its first week.

The EP debuted at number 2 on the Gaon Album Chart, while the lead single "Butterfly" debuted at number 118 on the Gaon Digital Chart on the chart issue dated June 7–13, 2020. The single also peaked at number 81 on the Billboard K-pop Hot 100.

According to Gaon, the EP has sold 100,719 units, placing number 7 for the month of June 2020. It became the group's first release to sell over 100,000 copies as well as their best-selling release, surpassing As You Wish which has sold over 96,000 copies to date.

Track listing

Charts

Awards and nominations 
Accolades

Music program wins

Release history

References 

Korean-language EPs
Starship Entertainment EPs
Cosmic Girls EPs
2020 EPs